The 47th Filmfare Awards were held on 16 February 2002 in Mumbai, India.

Kabhi Khushi Kabhie Gham... led the ceremony with 16 nominations, followed by Dil Chahta Hai with 13 nominations, and Lagaan and Gadar: Ek Prem Katha with 9 nominations each.

Lagaan won 8 awards, including Best Film, Best Director (for Ashutosh Gowariker) and Best Actor (for Aamir Khan), thus becoming the most-awarded film at the ceremony.

Aamir Khan received dual nominations for Best Actor for his performances in Dil Chahta Hai and Lagaan, winning for the latter.

Sisters Kareena Kapoor and Karisma Kapoor were nominated for Best Actress for their performances in Aśoka and Zubeidaa respectively, but both lost to Kajol who won the award for Kabhi Khushi Kabhie Gham....

Awards

Main Awards 
{| class="wikitable"
|-
! style="background:#EEDD82; width:50%;"|Best Film
! style="background:#EEDD82; width:50%;"|Best Director
|-
| valign="top" |
Lagaan
Asoka
Dil Chahta Hai
Gadar: Ek Prem Katha
Kabhi Khushi Kabhie Gham...
| valign="top" |
Ashutosh Gowariker – Lagaan Anil Sharma – Gadar: Ek Prem Katha
Farhan Akhtar – Dil Chahta Hai
Karan Johar – Kabhi Khushi Kabhie Gham...
Santosh Sivan – Asoka
|-
! style="background:#EEDD82;"| Best Actor
! style="background:#EEDD82;"| Best Actress
|-
| valign="top" |Aamir Khan – Lagaan Aamir Khan – Dil Chahta Hai
Amitabh Bachchan – Aks
Anil Kapoor – Nayak: The Real Hero
Shah Rukh Khan – Kabhi Khushi Kabhie Gham...
Sunny Deol – Gadar: Ek Prem Katha
| valign="top" |
 Kajol – Kabhi Khushi Kabhie Gham... 
Amisha Patel – Gadar: Ek Prem Katha
Kareena Kapoor – Asoka
Karisma Kapoor – Zubeidaa
Tabu – Chandni Bar
|-
! style="background:#EEDD82;"| Best Supporting Actor
! style="background:#EEDD82;"| Best Supporting Actress
|-
| valign="top"|
 Akshaye Khanna – Dil Chahta Hai
Ajay Devgan – Lajja
Amitabh Bachchan – Kabhi Khushi Kabhie Gham...
Hrithik Roshan – Kabhi Khushi Kabhie Gham...
Jackie Shroff – Yaadein
| valign="top"|
 Jaya Bachchan – Kabhi Khushi Kabhie Gham... 
Kareena Kapoor – Kabhi Khushi Kabhie Gham...
Madhuri Dixit – Lajja
Preity Zinta – Chori Chori Chupke Chupke
Rekha – Lajja
|-
! style="background:#EEDD82;"| Best Male Debut
! style="background:#EEDD82;"| Best Female Debut
|-
| valign="top"|
Tusshar Kapoor – Mujhe Kucch Kehna Hai
| valign="top"|
Bipasha Basu – Ajnabee
|-
! style="background:#EEDD82;"| Best Comic Role
! style="background:#EEDD82;"| Best Negative Role
|-
| valign="top"|
 Saif Ali Khan – Dil Chahta Hai
Govinda – Jodi No.1
Govinda – Kyo Kii... Main Jhuth Nahin Bolta
Johnny Lever – Ajnabee
Paresh Rawal – Yeh Teraa Ghar Yeh Meraa Ghar
| valign="top"|
 Akshay Kumar – Ajnabee
Aftab Shivdasani – Kasoor
Amrish Puri – Gadar: Ek Prem Katha
Manoj Bajpai – Aks
Urmila Matondkar – Pyaar Tune Kya Kiya
|-
! style="background:#EEDD82;"| Best Music Director
! style="background:#EEDD82;"| Best Lyricist
|-
|
 Lagaan – A. R. Rahman
Dil Chahta Hai – Shankar–Ehsaan–Loy
Gadar: Ek Prem Katha – Uttam Singh
Kabhi Khushi Kabhie Gham... – Jatin-Lalit
Mujhe Kucch Kehna Hai – Anu Malik
|
 Lagaan – Javed Akhtar for Radha Kaise Na Jale
Gadar: Ek Prem Katha – Anand Bakshi for Udja Kaale Kawaan
Kabhi Khushi Kabhie Gham... – Anil Pandey for Suraj Hua Maddham
Kabhi Khushi Kabhie Gham... – Sameer for Kabhi Khushi Kabhie Gham...
Lagaan – Javed Akhtar for Mitwa
|-
! style="background:#EEDD82;"| Best Playback Singer – Male
! style="background:#EEDD82;"| Best Playback Singer – Female
|-
|
  Lagaan – Udit Narayan for Mitwa 
Ajnabee – Adnan Sami for Mehbooba
Dil Chahta Hai – Shaan for Koi Kahe Kehta Rahe
Gadar: Ek Prem Katha – Udit Narayan for Udja Kaale Kawaan
Kabhi Khushi Kabhie Gham... – Sonu Nigam for Suraj Hua Maddham
|
 Lagaan – Alka Yagnik for O Re Chhori Aks – Vasundhara Das for Rabba Rabba
Asoka – Alka Yagnik for San Sanana
Dil Chahta Hai – Alka Yagnik for Jaane Kyun
Kabhi Khushi Kabhie Gham... – Alka Yagnik for Suraj Hua Maddham
Zubeidaa – Kavita Krishnamurthy for Dheeme Dheeme
|-
|}

Technical Awards

Special awards

Critics' awards
Best Film Dil Chahta Hai Best Actor Amitabh Bachchan – Aks Best Actress Karisma Kapoor – Zubeidaa Big winners and nominees
The following film received multiple nominations.

 16 nominations: Kabhi Khushi Kabhie Gham...
 13 nominations: Dil Chahta Hai
 9 nominations: Gadar: Ek Prem Katha & Lagaan
 6 nominations: Aks
 5 nominations: Asoka
 4 nominations: Ajnabee
 2 nominations: Zubeidaa

The following film received multiple awards.

 8 wins: Lagaan
 7 wins: Dil Chahta Hai
 5 wins: Kabhi Khushi Kabhie Gham...
 4 wins: Aks
 2 wins: Ajnabee & Gadar: Ek Prem Katha

See also
Filmfare Awards

References

Filmfare Awards
Filmfare